On VH1's Top 40 Videos Of The Year, the best music videos of a particular year were counted down.  From 2002 to 2014, thirteen videos were named Video of the Year: "Soak Up the Sun" by Sheryl Crow, "Unwell" by Matchbox Twenty, "Yeah!" by Usher featuring Ludacris & Lil' Jon, "We Belong Together" by Mariah Carey, "Buttons" by the Pussycat Dolls featuring Snoop Dogg, "Big Girls Don't Cry" by Fergie, "Bleeding Love" by Leona Lewis, "Poker Face" by Lady Gaga, "Hey, Soul Sister" by Train, "Rolling in the Deep" by Adele, "Somebody That I Used to Know" by Gotye featuring Kimbra, "Blurred Lines" by Robin Thicke featuring T.I. & Pharrell Williams and "All of Me" by John Legend.

Synopsis
Every year until 2014, towards the end of December, VH1 presented their annual Top 40 Videos of the Year. The list was based on the rotation of videos that appeared on VH1's weekly Top 20 Countdown over the course of the past year. In 2003, the Top 40 Videos of the Year were hosted by VH1's own Rachel Perry & Aamer Haleem. In 2004, the host was actress & musician Juliette Lewis. From 2005 onward, there were no hosts but commentaries from artists, comedians, & TV personalities were seen throughout each video. In 2012 and 2014, the special, hosted by Jim Shearer, changed to the Top 20 Videos of the Year and only aired one day instead of five. In 2013, the special changed back to the top 40 videos of the year.

2000

2001

2002

2003

2004

2005

2006

2007

2008

2009

2010

2011

2012

2013

2014

VH1 original programming
Music videos